Springer-Cranston House is a historic home located at Marshallton, New Castle County, Delaware. It was built in the late-18th century, and is a -story, four bay, coursed rubble stone dwelling with a two-story stuccoed stone service wing.  It has a Georgian interior floor plan and gable roof.  The house is constructed of local Brandywine granite.  It was originally a one-story, stone dwelling roughly 24 feet by 18 feet, and subsequently enlarged and modified during the first half of the 19th century.  The interior was modernized in the 1940s.

It was added to the National Register of Historic Places in 1994.

References

Houses on the National Register of Historic Places in Delaware
Georgian architecture in Delaware
Houses in New Castle County, Delaware
National Register of Historic Places in New Castle County, Delaware